Peanuts & Corn is a Canadian independent record label, releasing hip hop recordings since 1994.  They have also been a distributor of Canadian hip hop releases since 2002.

History
Peanuts & Corn was founded in Brandon, Manitoba, by Rod Bailey AKA mcenroe. The first recording to be produced under the label was The Space EP, created by mcenroe's band, Farm Fresh in 1994.

The label has since relocated first Winnipeg, Manitoba, and later Vancouver, British Columbia, where it is now based. One of the most actively involved artists at Peanuts & Corn hs been Pip Skid, who has also gone by the name of Wicked Nut.

By 2004 Peanuts & Corn, along with its sister company Breadwinner Music Group, was producing and releasing tracks and albums for a number of artists in the Canadian hip hop music scene,  As of 2010 there had been about 40 releases on Peanuts & Corn, and more on affiliated and subsidiary labels throughout Canada and internationally.

Artists with releases on P&C

P&C imprints and affiliations

See also 
 List of record labels

References 

Canadian independent record labels
Record labels established in 1994
Canadian hip hop record labels
Companies based in Brandon, Manitoba
1994 establishments in Manitoba